The Guhyagarbha Tantra (Skt.; Tib. རྒྱུད་གསང་བ་སྙིང་པོ་, Gyü Sangwé Nyingpo; Wyl. rgyud gsang ba'i snying po, "The Tantra of the Secret Essence" or the "Secret Womb Tantra") is the most important Buddhist tantra of the Mahayoga class and the primary tantric text studied in the Nyingma tradition. It is the main Nyingma source for understanding empowerment, samaya, mantras, mandalas and other Vajrayana topics, and has influenced the Dzogchen tradition. The Nyingma scholar Longchenpa sees it as "the highest summit of all vehicles, the source of all verbal transmissions, the great great shortcut of the vehicle of all Buddhas of the three times, the most secret."

Overview 

Its full title is the Glorious Web of Magical Illusion, The Secret Essence Definitive Nature Just As It Is (Tib. Pal Gyutrül Drawa Sangwé Nyingpo De Kona Nyid Ngé Pa, Wyl. dpal  sgyu 'phrul drva ba gsang ba'i snying po de kho na nyid nges pa). It is also often called The Tantra of the Web of Magical Illusion (Tib. Gyutrül Drawa Gyü, Wyl. sgyu 'phrul drva ba rgyud).

The Nyingma school holds that Garab Dorje received the empowerment and transmission of the Mahayoga teachings of the Guhyagarbha from the indian Mahasiddha Kukuraja.

The Secret Womb actually refers to a collection of nineteen texts in the Tibetan canon. The main works include a short version in twenty-two chapters, an intermediate version (forty-six chapters) and a long version (eighty two chapters). These texts describe a mandala of forty-two peaceful deities and fifty-eight fierce deities. According to John Powers, its central teaching "holds that all things manifest spontaneously (thams cad rang snang), and mind and primordial wisdom also manifest spontaneously (sems dang ye shes rang snang)." The Secret Womb texts discuss numerous tantric Buddhist topics, such as the creation of mandalas, the practice of controlling the winds and drops within energy channels, the purification of the five aggregates, and the qualities and activities of the Buddhas.

Tibetan interpreters generally see the Secret Womb Tantra as a guide to the Buddhist practice of Mahayoga, also termed deity yoga, a tantric method of realizing the true nature of reality and attaining Buddhahood. This method mainly relies on the imagination to create a Buddha image in one's mind during a tantric ritual and then to merge this Buddha with oneself.

According to Gyurme Dorje: "The iconography and symbolism of the hundred peaceful and wrathful deities presented in the Guhyagarbha Tantra subsequently gave rise to a whole genre of literature in Tibet known as the Cycles of the Peaceful and Wrathful Deities (zhi-khro)." 

The Tibetan Book of the Dead (Bardo Thodol) is one such zhi-khro text.

Commentaries

Vilāsavajra dpal gsang ba snying po’i ’grel pa rin po che’i spar khab slob dpon sgeg pa'i rdo rjes mdzad pa - "Blazing Palace".
Vimalamitra (8th century)
rdo rje sems dpa’i sgyu ’phrul dra ba’i rgyud dpal gsang ba’i snying po shes bya ba’i spyan ’grel pa "Eye Opening" Commentary on the Secret Essence P4756
dpal gsang ba snying po’i don bsdus ’grel piṇḍārtha ("Ball of Meaning").
Rongzom Pandita, Chökyi Zangpo (1012–1088)
Longchenpa (1308–1363) mun sel skor gsum - "Trilogy of Dispelling Darkness" - Three commentaries on the Guhyagarbha Tantra:
 dpal gsang ba snying po de kho na nyid nges pa'i rgyud kyi grel ba phyogs bcu'i mun sel/ -"Dispelling Darkness in the Ten Directions" - Detailed commentary on the Guhyagarbha Tantra
 dpal gsang ba snying po'i spyi don legs par bshad pa'i snang bas yid kyi mun pa thams cad sel ba/ - "Dispelling the Darkness of the Mind" General meaning of the Guhyagarbha Tantra
 dpal gsang ba snying po'i rgyud kyi bsdus pa'i don ma rig mun pa thams cad sel ba/ - "Dispelling Darkness of Ignorance" - Condensed meaning of the Guhyagarbha Tantra
 Minling Lochen Dharma Shri (1654–1718) -
dpal gsang ba snying po de kho na nyid nges pa'i rgyud kyi 'grel ba gsang bdag dgongs rgyan/ - Textual exegesis of the Guhyagarbha Tantra
dpal gsang ba snying po de kho na nyid nges pa'i rgyud kyi rgyal po sgyu 'phrul drwa ba spyi don gyi sgo nas gtan la 'bebs par byed pa'i legs bshad sang bdag shal lung/ - General commentary on the Guhyagarbha tantra.
Mipham (1846–1912) gsang 'grel phyogs bcu'i mun sel gyi spyi don 'od gsal snying po/ - An exegesis of Longchenpa's commentary on the Guhyagarbha Tantra
Dodrup Chen III, Jigme Tenpai Nyima (1865–1926) - dpal gsang ba’i snying po’i rgyud kyi spyi don nyung ngu’i ngag gis rnam par ’byed pa rin chen mdzod kyi lde mig "Key to the Precious Treasury" - A General Commentary on the Guhyagarbha Tantra.
Khenpo Shenga  (1871–1927) - Annotated Commentary on the Guhyagarbha Tantra

See also
Eighteen great tantras

Notes

References
Dharma Fellowship (2005). Biographies: Pramodavajra, Regent of the Divine.  Source:  (accessed: November 15, 2007)

Further reading 
Guhyagarbha Tantra: Tibetan Text - at THDL

 

 Parts: ,2, 3, 4, 5, 6.

 

Sherab, Khenchen Palden and Khenpo Tsewang Dongyal. (2011). Splendid Presence of the Great Guhyagarbha: Opening the Wisdom Door of the King of All Tantras. Sidney Center, New York: Dharma Samudra.

External links
Guhyagarbha Tantra in Ripa Wiki , 2019 Sep 20 visited 
Six-part series of Gyurme Dorje's introduction to Guhyagarbha Tantra

Nyingma tantras